Norlander may refer to:

 Emil Norlander (1865-1935), Swedish journalist, author, songwriter and producer
 Erik Norlander (born 1967), musician
 Göran Norlander (born 1945), Swedish politician
 Johnny Norlander (1921-2002), basketball player
 Stephanie Norlander (born 1995), Canadian field hockey player